Tamara Heribanová (born 6 May 1985) is a Slovak writer, journalist and presenter.

Early life and education
She spent her student years in Austria. When she was nine, she attended the UNESCO elementary school in Kittsee. At the age of fourteen, she moved to Vienna and continued at the BORG3 high school with a specialisation in foreign languages and fine arts. A few months spent on language courses in Forli (Italy) and Brighton (UK) also contributed to her studying process. 
As a teenager, she was already combining photographs and paintings with texts and written appeals, followed by columns, reviews and short stories. At the age of seventeen her short story concerning World War Two was published in the book Jugendliche schreiben gegen das Vergessen (2003), based on an idea by Willi Mernyi.

She studied journalism and communication sciences at the University of Vienna and graduated from Literature and German studies in Utrecht University in the Netherlands. Three years later, she graduated from a university in Bratislava, holding a diploma in marketing communications. Her final thesis called Testimonial Marketing was innovative and rare, the first of its kind in Slovakia. It was published in the collection Reklama 10 in 2010 at Comenius University in Bratislava. Heribanová is a postgraduate at the Institute of World Literature of the Slovak Academy of Sciences.
She is married to photographer Branislav Šimončík.

Career
During her studies, she was contributing to numerous Slovak magazines. For nine years, she has been working as an editor for a monthly magazine EMMA, while publishing interviews and articles in the Czech version of the magazine ELLE and in a bimonthly magazine concerning young literature and art called Dotyky (Touches), where she also holds the position of a member of an editorial board since 2013.

Books
Heribanová's short stories have been translated and published in anthologies and magazines in Austria, the Netherlands, Serbia, the Czech Republic and Taiwan.
In her debut novel Predavačky bublín (Bubble Sellers) (2010)  she introduced the world of media, false corrupted people in the show business and today's generation. Her book Bola to len láska (It was only Love) (2012)  describes fear from intensive feelings and analyses the question of inner freedom. Her book Misia Eva, prísne tajné (Mission Eva, Strictly Confidential) (2012)  describes a loving, fragile children's world where the strength is based on true values and good-heartedness. A tablet app game was created based on the book. In 2013 the book won the third place in a readers’ poll Knižná revue, in 2012    book was awarded with The most beautiful Slovak book in the category of literature for children and teenagers. The book became the topic of dozens of talks, reading sessions and workshops at schools and libraries in Slovakia.

Heribanová cooperated on the books Príbehy v znamení túžby (Tales in the Name of Passion) (also published in the Czech Republic, Mladá fronta, 2012) and V dobrom aj v zlom an ešte v horšom (In good and bad times and even worse times) - for the project AVON proti domácemu násiliu (AVON against the domestic violence) (also published in the Czech Republic, Magenta, 2012). She is a member of the Slovak PEN Centre and stands behind the project Knihobežník (A Book Runner), which is based on the idea of reading a book and giving it to somebody else. Being the first, Heribanová donated her book Predavačky bublín (Bubble Sellers) to the project.

Television
Together with Miguel Herz-Kestranek, she presented the television programme TRIDENTITY, a live broadcasting on ORF in May 2004 when Slovakia and the Czech Republic joined the European Union. Regional television TV BA (Bratislava), where she presented Metropolitný magazín (Metropolitan magazine), TV Markiza and a programme called Teleráno (Tele-morning), where she presented news about books, talked about reviews and interesting facts about writers, which helped her to gain vast experience in TV. On STV (Slovak Television) Tamara presented TV series Ranný magazín (Morning magazine) along with Gregor Mareš, and a fashion programme Zmenáreň (Exchange office).

References

1985 births
Living people
Writers from Bratislava
Slovak journalists
Slovak women journalists
University of Vienna alumni
Utrecht University alumni
Comenius University alumni
Slovak television presenters
Slovak women television presenters